Milton Ramírez Barboza (April 2, 1950 – August 18, 2022) was a Puerto Rican Major League Baseball infielder.

Ramírez signed with the Baltimore Orioles as an amateur free agent in 1968. The St. Louis Cardinals selected him from the Orioles organization in the Rule 5 draft after the 1969 season. He batted .190 in 87 plate appearances across 62 games played for the Cardinals in the 1970 season. Ramírez appeared in four games for the Cardinals in the 1971 season. The Cardinals traded Ramírez along with Skip Jutze to the Houston Astros for Ray Busse and Bobby Fenwick on November 29, 1972. Ramírez played for the Oakland Athletics in 1979. He batted .161 in 28 games before he was sent to the minor leagues.

Ramírez died on August 18, 2022, at the age of 72.

References

External links
 

1950 births
2022 deaths
Aberdeen Pheasants players
Arkansas Travelers players
Bluefield Orioles players
Bravos de Reynosa players
Columbus Astros players
Denver Bears players
Florida Instructional League Orioles players
Indios de Mayagüez players
Jacksonville Suns players
Major League Baseball second basemen
Major League Baseball shortstops
Major League Baseball third basemen
Major League Baseball players from Puerto Rico
Miami Marlins (FSL) players
Oakland Athletics players
Ogden A's players
People from Mayagüez, Puerto Rico
Piratas de Campeche players
Puerto Rican expatriate baseball players in Canada
Puerto Rican expatriate baseball players in Mexico
San Jose Missions players
St. Louis Cardinals players
Tiburones de La Guaira players
Puerto Rican expatriate baseball players in Venezuela
Vancouver Canadians players
Waterbury Dodgers players